Roberts Branch may refer to:

Roberts Branch (Clinton County, Missouri), a stream in Missouri
Roberts Branch (Osage River), a stream in Missouri